Hill Farm in Stawley, Somerset, England was built in the late 16th century. It is a Grade II* listed building.

History

The farmhouse was built in the late 16th or early 17th century. It was an outlying farm of Cothay Manor.

The farm now has around 100 goats and makes three kinds of cheese. In 2008 a new barn, milking parlour and dairy was constructed.

Architecture

The "L" shaped stone building has a slated cruck roof.

References

Grade II* listed buildings in Taunton Deane
Farmhouses in England
Farms in Somerset